"Him & I" is a song recorded by American rapper G-Eazy and American singer Halsey. It was written by G-Eazy, Halsey, Edgar Machuca, Jim Lavigne, Dakarai Gwitira, Madison Love, and production duo The Futuristics. The song was released via RCA Records on November 30, 2017, as the second single from G-Eazy's third studio album, The Beautiful & Damned. The single reached the top 20 of the charts in the United States, Australia, Canada as well as multiple other countries.

Background and release
On August 30, 2017, G-Eazy debuted the song with a performance at Blue Nile in New Orleans for the final show of his Bud Light's Dive Bar Tour. Halsey joined him on stage as a surprise guest, and she kissed Eazy for several seconds at the end of the performance. Eazy told Fuse in an interview before the concert:"I've wanted to work with Halsey for a long time. I think she's an incredibly talented artist who has accomplished so much at such a young age. She's one of the biggest artists in the whole world. At 22 years old, that's pretty phenomenal. 'Him & I' is a Bonnie and Clyde song. It's a pretty intense, crazy in love song. She killed the record. She sounds phenomenal on it. I'm excited to share that experience onstage with her live one on one because she's a great performer."Eazy told Billboard about the song as well as the Cardi B collaboration "No Limit": "That raw connection between the two performers is something you can't fully plan. You just go with it and get lost in that moment and feed off of each other." Eazy and Halsey first teased the song through Instagram on November 28, 2017. "This Friday me and lil baby dropping 'Him & I,'" Halsey captioned with a rose emoji. Eazy captioned the same photo with "'Him & I' w baby girl out this Friday..." and heart emojis. Eazy told Entertainment Weekly about working with Halsey: "It was super important to get her on the album. She's incredible, and I've been a big fan of hers for a long time, even before she was my girlfriend. Telling a story like the one we tell on ["Him & I"] adds a level of authenticity and honesty to our love story and [explores] how love fits into this crazy lifestyle that we live."

Speaking to KAMP-FM, Halsey stressed that the song is not "a contrived thing" nor "two artists pretending to be something they're not for the sake of a story", as the track mirrors their real-life love story. She furthered: "It's like we really made this record about our real lives and hopefully we get to share that with other people who feel similarly about each other and we're really fortunate. We live really cool lives and we get to do really cool stuff together and I just hope that, you know, some young couple somewhere in a slower part of world maybe can hear it and maybe imagine what it would be like for just four minutes."

Composition
According the sheet music published on Musicnotes.com, "Him & I" is composed in the key of A minor and set in a  time signature at a steady tempo of 88 beats per minute.

Critical reception
Megan Armstrong of Billboard praised the song, writing that it "maintains each artist's individual identities while also fluidly melding them into one", as "Halsey's voice maintains the same eerie and powerful feel the world has come to associate with her, leading into G's rap verses". Rap-Up wrote: "The romantic anthem finds Halsey on the soaring chorus, with her sultry vocals over the pulsating beat."

Music video
The accompanying music video begins with the line, "They were stars on this stage. Each playing to an audience of two," a F. Scott Fitzgerald quote from The Beautiful and Damned, followed by shots of the Brooklyn Bridge. Eazy and Halsey can be seen wandering the streets of New York City, as well as hanging out in dive bars. Eazy noted in a tweet: "One of my favorite videos I've ever done, because it's the most real, no extra shit, just her and I over a couple days in the city."

Live performances
On December 12, 2017, G-Eazy performed the duet live on Jimmy Kimmel Live! with Halsey, along with a solo version of "No Limit". The pair took a cinematic approach to their performance on the outdoor stage, beginning with a camera following Halsey as she walk down an alley, while another tracking Eazy, who rolled up to the venue in a vintage black Mercedes. On December 19, 2017, they performed the song on Good Morning America. On January 13, 2018, they performed the song on Saturday Night Live.

Credits and personnel
Credits adapted from Tidal.
 G-Eazy – songwriting
 Halsey – songwriting
 Jim Lavigne – songwriting
 Dakarai Gwitira – songwriting, recording engineering
 Madison Love – songwriting
 Edgar Machuca – songwriting
 The Futuristics – songwriting, production
 Jaycen Joshua – mixing engineering
 Serban Ghenea – mixing engineering
 Sean Malone – guitar [the Jiffian]

Charts

Weekly charts

Year-end charts

Certifications

Release history

See also
List of Airplay 100 number ones of the 2010s

References

2017 songs
2017 singles
G-Eazy songs
Halsey (singer) songs
Number-one singles in Romania
RCA Records singles
Songs written by Halsey (singer)
Song recordings produced by the Futuristics
Songs written by Joe Khajadourian
Songs written by Alex Schwartz
Songs written by Madison Love
Songs written by G-Eazy